San Giovanni del Dosso is a comune (municipality) in the Province of Mantua in the Italian region Lombardy, located about  southeast of Milan and about  southeast of Mantua.

San Giovanni del Dosso borders the following municipalities: Concordia sulla Secchia, Mirandola, Poggio Rusco, Quistello, San Giacomo delle Segnate, Schivenoglia, Borgo Mantovano.

The painter Dosso Dossi was a native of San Giovanni del Dosso.

References

External links
 Official website

Cities and towns in Lombardy